Nebria rubicunda is a species of brown coloured ground beetle in the Nebriinae subfamily that can be found in Algeria, Morocco, Tunisia and in Spain.

Subspecies
Nebria rubicunda rubicunda Quensel, 1806

References

External links
Nebria rubicunda at Fauna Europaea

rubicunda
Beetles described in 1806
Beetles of North Africa
Beetles of Europe
Taxa named by Conrad Quensel